Corona (beer)
Coronita, California
Coronita (sg.), (in rum, pl form:coronite), foreign word for care item "teeth bracelet superior and teeth bracelet inferior."